ISO/IEC JTC 1/SC 34, Document description and processing languages is a subcommittee of the ISO/IEC JTC 1 joint technical committee, which is a collaborative effort of both the International Organization for Standardization and the International Electrotechnical Commission, which develops and facilitates standards within the field of document description and processing languages. The international secretariat of ISO/IEC JTC 1/SC 34 is the Japanese Industrial Standards Committee (JISC) located in Japan.

Scope
The scope of ISO/IEC JTC 1/SC 34 is as follows. Standardization in the field of document structures, languages and related facilities for the description and processing of compound and hypermedia documents, including:
 languages for document logical structures and their support facilities
 languages for describing document-like objects in web environments
 document processing architecture and
 formatting for logical documents
 languages for describing interactive documents
 multilingual font information interchange and related services
 final-form document architecture and page information interchange
 hypermedia document structuring language and application resources
 APIs for document processing

Structure
ISO/IEC JTC 1/SC 34 is made up of four active working groups, each of which carries out specific tasks in standards development within the field of document description and processing languages. As a response to changing standardization needs, working groups of ISO/IEC JTC 1/SC 34 can be disbanded if their area of work is no longer applicable, or established if new working areas arise. The focus of each working group is described in the group’s terms of reference. Active working groups of ISO/IEC JTC 1/SC 34 are:

Collaborations
ISO/IEC JTC 1/SC 34 works in close collaboration with a number of other organizations or subcommittees, both internal and external to ISO or IEC, in order to avoid conflicting or duplicative work. Organizations internal to ISO or IEC that collaborate with or are in liaison to ISO/IEC JTC 1/SC 34 include:
 ISO/IEC JTC 1/SC 2, Coded character sets
 ISO/IEC JTC 1/SC 29, Coding of audio, picture, multimedia and hypermedia information
 ISO/IEC JTC 1/SC 36, Information technology for learning, education and training
 ISO/TC 46, Information and documentation
 ISO/TC 171, Document management applications
 ISO/TC 171/SC 2, Application issues
 ISO/TC 184/SC 4, Industrial data
 IEC/TC 100, Audio, video and multimedia systems and equipment
Some organizations external to ISO or IEC that collaborate with or are in liaison to ISO/IEC JTC 1/SC 34 include:
 Ecma International
 Organization for the Advancement of Structured Information Standards (OASIS)

Member Countries
Countries pay a fee to ISO to be members of subcommittees.

The 26 "P" (participating) members of ISO/IEC JTC 1/SC 34 are: Armenia, Bulgaria, Chile, China, Czech Republic, Egypt, Finland, France, Germany, India, Italy, Japan, Republic of Korea, Lebanon, Luxembourg, Malaysia, Malta, Netherlands, Pakistan, Poland, Russian Federation, Slovakia, South Africa, Sri Lanka, United Kingdom, and United States. 

The 30 "O" (observing) members of ISO/IEC JTC 1/SC 34 are: Argentina, Austria, Belgium, Bosnia and Herzegovina, Brazil, Canada, Croatia, Cyprus, Côte d'Ivoire, Denmark, Greece, Hong Kong, Hungary, Indonesia, Islamic Republic of Iran, Ireland, Israel, Kazakhstan, Lithuania, Mexico, Norway, Portugal, Romania, Serbia, Spain, Sweden, Switzerland, Thailand, Turkey, and Ukraine.

Published Standards
ISO/IEC JTC 1/SC 34 currently has 70 published standards within the field of document description and processing languages, including:

See also
 ISO/IEC JTC 1
 List of ISO standards
 Japanese Industrial Standards Committee
 International Organization for Standardization
 International Electrotechnical Commission
 OpenDocument
 Office Open XML
 EPUB

References

External links 
 ISO/IEC JTC1/SC34 Page at ISO

Computer file formats
034